Aisha Mohammed Mussa is an Ethiopian engineer and politician who is currently serving as Minister of Irrigation and Lowland Areas Development. She previously served as Defense Minister from October 2018 until 18 April 2019, and Minister of Construction and Urban Development 18 April 2019 - 6 October 2021.

Early life and education
Aisha Mohammed is a Muslim from the country's Afar Region in the north east Ethiopia. She has a degree in Civil Engineering and a masters in Transformational Leadership and Change.

Career
Mohammed is a civil engineer and previously served as construction minister. She also served as Minister of Tourism and Culture. She was appointed Defence Minister by Prime Minister Abiy Ahmed on 16 October 2018, one of ten women appointed to the twenty member cabinet, making Ethiopia and Rwanda the only African countries to have equal gender representation in their cabinets. Mohammed was the country's first female defence minister. On 18 April 2019, she was appointed Minister of Urban Development and Construction.

References

1979 births
Living people
People from Afar Region
Women government ministers of Ethiopia
Female defence ministers
Culture ministers of Ethiopia
Defence ministers of Ethiopia
Tourism ministers of Ethiopia
Urban planning ministers of Ethiopia
21st-century Ethiopian politicians
21st-century Ethiopian women politicians